The 1999 Italian local elections were held on 13 June and 27 June.

In Sicily the elections were also held on November 28 (first round) and December 12 (second round).

In Trentino-Alto Adige the elections were held on May 16 (first round) and May 30 (second round).

The elections were overall won by The Olive Tree coalition, with 21 municipalities won out of 32 and 46 provinces out of 67.

Municipal elections

Mayoral election results

Provincial elections

References

1999 elections in Italy
 
Municipal elections in Italy
June 1999 events in Europe